Wapkia is an extinct genus of sea sponge with radial sclerites, known from the Middle Cambrian Burgess Shale. It was first described in 1920 by Charles Doolittle Walcott. 32 specimens of Wapkia are known from the Greater Phyllopod bed, where they comprise 0.06% of the community.

References

External links 
 
 with image

Burgess Shale fossils
Protomonaxonida
Burgess Shale sponges
Prehistoric sponge genera
Taxa named by Charles Doolittle Walcott
Fossil taxa described in 1920

Cambrian genus extinctions